García is a municipality of Isla Margarita in the state of Nueva Esparta, Venezuela. The capital is El Valle del Espíritu Santo.

Municipalities of Nueva Esparta
Margarita Island